Del Ray may refer to:

Jimmy Del Ray (1962–2014), American professional wrestler
Del Ray (magician) (c. 1927–2003), American magician
Del Ray, a neighborhood in Alexandria, Virginia
A common misspelling for Del Rey
A brand of drums made by Teisco

See also

Delray (disambiguation)
Del Rey (disambiguation)